Liashur Saray-e Ostad Vali (also Romanized as Līāshūr Sarāy-e Ostād Valī) is a village in Lat Leyl Rural District, Otaqvar District, Langarud County, Gilan Province, Iran. At the 2006 census, its population was 46, in 13 families.

References 

Populated places in Langarud County